Copromyces is a genus of fungi within the Sordariaceae family. This is a monotypic genus, containing the single species Copromyces bisporus.

References

External links
Copromyces at Index Fungorum

Sordariales
Monotypic Sordariomycetes genera